XinQi Dong is a doctor of medicine in geriatric medicine and internal medicine, and President and CEO of the Institute for Population Health Sciences.Founded in 2022, the Institute for Population Health Sciences (IPHS) seeks to advance population health sciences through scientific research, adaptive training and coaching, and partnership development to improve health and wellbeing of diverse populations.

As an expert on population health and aging issues, Dong has appeared in multiple media outlets, including The New York Times, The Wall Street Journal, The Washington Post, Politico, The Huffington Post, Reuters, Science Daily, International Business Times, CBS Chicago, Fox News, NBC News, New America Media, DNA info, and many others.

Dr. Dong has led multiple population-based epidemiological studies, including the New Jersey Population Health Cohort Study, The PINE Study and the Asian Resource Centers for Minority Aging Research to quantify the causal relationships among trauma, resilience and health outcomes.

Dong also has led several epidemiological studies, investigating more than 4,000 Chinese adults, in order to better understand the health and well-being of Chinese families in the United States.

Recent studies

New Jersey Population Health Cohort Study 
The New Jersey Population Health Cohort Study, currently in a one-year design phase, aims to improve the understanding of drivers of population health and health equity in the state. The study will collect granular data over time on approximately 10,000 New Jersey residents representing a broad section of the population, with additional focus on diverse immigrant groups. The first round of data collection is expected to begin in late 2020.

The PINE Study 
The PINE Study (Population Study of ChINese Elderly in Chicago) is a longitudinal study of Chinese older adults who are more than 60 of age living in the Chicago area. The goal is to find out the factors that impact the health and well-being of this population.

The PIETY Study 
The PIETY Study is cross-sectional study investigating Chinese adult children (aged 21 or above) of the participants from the PINE study. The objectives of the PIETY Study is to better understand the factors that influence the health of Chinese elderly from the perspectives of the adult children.

Cognitive Impairment Caregiving Study 
Cognitive Impairment Caregiving Study aims to explore the unique cultural determinants of caregiving experience of adult children whose parent/parent-in-law has memory loss issues, and identify the barriers and challenges those adult children are facing.

Promoting Social and Emotional Well-Being in the Chinese Community 
Promoting Social and Emotional Well-Being in the Chinese Community program aims to lower rates of mental distress and promote mental well-being of U.S. Chinese adults through the assistance of community health workers (CHWs). By using empowering education, referral to treatment, care coordination, and behavioral activation, CHWs help the participant understand and cope with their emotions, and make concrete steps toward improving their mental health and overall well-being.

Awards

Current grants 
New Jersey Minority Aging Collaborative: R24AG063729
Asian Resource Centers for Minority Aging Research (RCMAR): P30AG059304
 National Institute on Nursing Research: R01NR 014846_A1
 National Institute of Aging/NINR/NIMH: R01AG042318
 National Institute of Minority Health and Health Disparity: R01MD006173
 National Cancer Institute: R01CA163830, P20CA165592
 National Institute on Mental Health: R34 MH 100393A1, R34 MH 100443A1
 Administration on Aging/ACL: 09EJIG0005-01-00:
 China Beijing Science and Technology
 National Opinion Research Center (NORC)

References

Living people
Rush University faculty
University of Chicago alumni
Rush Medical College alumni
Year of birth missing (living people)
21st-century Chinese physicians
21st-century American physicians
Rutgers University faculty
Physicians from Jiangsu
Scientists from Nanjing
Chinese emigrants to the United States